2022 in United States rugby league saw an eventful season, featuring developments in the governance of the sport within the United States, the split between the United States Association of Rugby League (USARL) and the North American Rugby League (NARL) in regards to the national competition, and the conduction of multiple regional leagues below these.

Governance Reforms 
In 2022, the International Rugby League officially established the Commission for Rugby League in the United States (USARLC) as the governing body for rugby league in the United States. This will see control of the international game transferred from the USARL to the new commission, while the domestic scene will see major changes with the AMNRL to return as the domestic competition in the northern states, the USARL to remain as the legal domestic competition in the southern states, and the Championship Rugby League to become the western national-level competition. The North American Rugby League will remain unsanctioned.

2022 USARL Season

Clubs 
Although seven teams were scheduled to participate in the 2022 season, from four states, the entire North Conference was cancelled, leaving only four teams, all from Florida, to compete in the season.

Results

Round 1

Round 2

Round 3

Round 4

Round 5

Round 6

Round 7 

Source:

Ladder 

Source:

Grand Final 

Source:

North Conference Exhibition Matches 
Following the abandonment of the North Conference season, the USARL organised a series of exhibition matches between the three North Conference sides and independent former NARL side New York Freedom.

Source:

2022 NARL Season 
The North American Rugby League aimed to kick-off its inaugural season in 2022. However, the loss of the Brooklyn and Cleveland clubs along with the confirmation of Ottawa's move to Cornwall and the collapse of broadcast partner SportsFlick saw the season abandoned. The future of the competition is unclear, as only the DC Cavalry and Atlanta Rhinos remain affiliated with the NARL organisation.

Clubs 

   Atlanta Rhinos
   Brooklyn Kings
   Cleveland R.L.F.C.
   DC Cavalry
   New York Freedom
   Toronto Wolfpack

Regional Leagues

Championship Rugby League

Teams 

   East Palo Alto Razorbacks
   Laie Rhinos
   Sin City Islanders
   North Bay Warriors
   Provo Steelers
   Sacramento Immortals
   Salt Lake City Spartans
   San Francisco Savage
   Utah Saints Rugby

Championship final 
 Sacramento Immortals 16–20  Laie Rhinos

Source:

Lonestar Rugby League 
The 2022 Lonestar Rugby League (LRL) season was a rugby league competition planned in Texas.

Midwest Rugby League 
The Midwest Rugby League (MWRL) was dormant in 2022

References 

2022 in rugby league
Seasons in American rugby league